A Cabinet Mission came to India in 1946 in order to discuss the transfer of power from the British government to the Indian political leadership, with the aim of preserving India's unity and granting its independence. Formed at the initiative of Clement Attlee (the Prime Minister of the United Kingdom), the mission contained as its members, Lord Pethick-Lawrence (Secretary of State for India), Sir Stafford Cripps (President of the Board of Trade), and A.V. Alexander (First Lord of the Admiralty). The Viceroy of India Lord Wavell participated in some of the discussions. 

The Cabinet Mission Plan, formulated by the group, proposed a three-tier administrative structure for British India, with the Federal Union at the top tier, individual provinces at the bottom tier, and Groups of provinces as a middle tier.  Three Groups were proposed, called Groups A, B and C, respectively, for Northwest India, eastern India, and the remaining central portions of India.

The Plan lost steam due to the distrust between the Indian National Congress and the Muslim League, and the British Government replaced Lord Wavell with a new viceroy, Lord Mountbatten, to find new solutions.

Background
Towards the end of their rule, the British found that their temporary patronage of the Muslim League conflicted with their longstanding need for Indian unity. The desire for a united India was an outcome of both their pride in having politically unified the subcontinent and the doubts of most British authorities as to the feasibility of Pakistan. This desire for Indian unity was symbolized by the Cabinet Mission, which arrived in New Delhi on 24 March 1946, sent by the British government, in which the subject was the formation of a post-independent India. The three men who constituted the mission, A.V Alexander, Stafford Cripps, pethick Lawrence favoured India's unity for strategic reasons.

Upon arriving in the subcontinent the mission found both parties, the Indian National Congress and Muslim League, more unwilling than ever to reach a settlement. The two parties had performed well in the elections, general and provincial, and emerged as the two main parties in the subcontinent, the provincial organizations having been defeated. This was because of the separate electorates system. The Muslim League had been victorious in approximately 90 percent of the seats for Muslims. After having achieved victory in the elections Jinnah gained a strong hand to bargain with the British and Congress. Having established the system of separate electorates, the British could no longer reverse its consequences which they wanted all along.

Plan
The mission made its own proposals, after inconclusive dialogue with the Indian leadership, seeing that the Congress opposed Jinnah's demand for a Pakistan comprising six full provinces. The mission proposed a complicated  system for India with three tiers: the provinces, provincial groupings and the centre. The centre's power was to be confined to foreign affairs, defence, currency and communications. The provinces would keep all the other powers and were allowed to establish three groups. The plan's main characteristic was the grouping of provinces. Two groups would  be constituted by the mainly-Muslim western and eastern provinces. The third group would comprise the mostly-Hindu areas in the south and the centre. Thus provinces such as UP, CP, Bombay, Bihar, Orissa and Madras would make Group A. Group B would comprise Sind, Punjab, Northwest Frontier and Baluchistan. Bengal and Assam would make a Group C. Princely States will retain all subjects and powers (non central government's powers) other than those ceded to the Union.

Reactions
Through the scheme, the British expected to maintain Indian unity, as both they and Congress wanted, while also providing Jinnah the substance of Pakistan. The proposals almost satisfied Jinnah's insistence on a large Pakistan, which would avert the North-Eastern Pakistan without the mostly non-Muslim districts in Bengal and Punjab being partitioned away. By holding the full provinces of Punjab and Bengal, Jinnah could satisfy the provincial leaders who feared losing power if their provinces were divided. The presence of large Hindu minorities in Punjab and Bengal also provided a safeguard for the Muslim minorities remaining in the mostly-Hindu provinces.

Most of all, Jinnah wanted parity between Pakistan and India. He believed that provincial groupings could best secure this. He claimed that Muslim India was a 'nation' with entitlement to central representations equal to those of Hindu India. Despite his preference for only two groups, the Muslim League's Council accepted the mission's proposals on 6 June 1946, after securing a guarantee from Wavell that the League would be placed in the interim government if the Congress did not accept the proposal.

The onus was now on Congress. It accepted the proposals, understanding it to be a repudiation of the demand for Pakistan, and its position was that the provinces should be allowed to stay out of groups that they did not want to join, in light of both NWFP and Assam being ruled by Congress governments. However, Jinnah differed and saw the grouping plan as mandatory. Another point of difference concerned the Congress position that a sovereign constituent assembly would not be bound to the plan. Jinnah insisted it be binding once the plan was accepted. The groupings plan maintained India's unity, but the organisation's leadership and, most of all Nehru, increasingly believed that the scheme would leave the centre without the strength to achieve the party's ambitions. Congress's socialist section led by Nehru desired a government able to industrialize the country and to eliminate poverty.

Nehru's speech on 10 July 1946 rejected the idea that the provinces would be obliged to join a group and stated that the Congress was neither bound nor committed to the plan. In effect, Nehru's speech squashed the mission's plan and the chance to keep India united. Jinnah interpreted the speech as another instance of treachery by the Congress. With Nehru's speech on groupings, the Muslim League rescinded its previous approval of the plan on 29 July.

Interim government and breakdown
Concerned by the diminishing British power, Wavell was eager to inaugurate an interim government. Disregarding Jinnah's vote, he authorised a cabinet in which Nehru was the interim prime minister. Sidelined and with his Pakistan of "groups" refused, Jinnah became distraught. To achieve Pakistan and impose on Congress that he could not be sidelined, he resorted to calling for his supporters to utilize "direct action" to demonstrate their support for Pakistan, in the same manner as Gandhi's civil disobedience campaigns, though it led to rioting and massacres on religious grounds in some areas. Direct Action Day further increased Wavell's resolve to establish the interim government. On 2 September 1946, Nehru's cabinet was installed.

Millions of Indian Muslim households flew black flags to protest the installation of the Congress government. Jinnah did not himself join the interim government but sent Liaquat Ali Khan into it to play a secondary role. Congress did not want to give him the important position of home minister and instead allowed him the post of finance minister. Liaquat Ali Khan infuriated Congress by using his role to prevent the functioning of Congress ministries, demonstrating (under Jinnah's instructions) the impossibility of a single government for India.

Britain tried to revive the Cabinet Mission's scheme by sending Nehru, Jinnah and Wavell in December to meet Attlee, Cripps and Pethick-Lawrence. The inflexible arguments were enough to cause Nehru to return to India and announce that "we have now altogether stopped looking towards London." Meanwhile, Wavell commenced the Constituent Assembly, which the League boycotted. He anticipated that the League would enter it as it had joined the interim government. Instead, the Congress became more forceful and asked him to drop ministers from the Muslim League. Wavell was also not able to obtain a declaration from the British government that would articulate their goals.

In the context of the worsening situation, Wavell drew up a breakdown plan that provided for a gradual British exit, but his plan was considered fatalistic by the Cabinet. When he insisted on his plan, he was replaced with Lord Mountbatten.

See also
Opposition to the partition of India

References

Bibliography
Ian Talbot; Gurharpal Singh (23 July 2009). The Partition of India Cambridge University Press.   
Hermanne Kulke; Dietmar Rothermund. A History of India (4th ed.). Routledge
Barbara Metcalf; Thomas Metcalf (2006). A Concise History of Modern India(PDF) (2nd ed.). Cambridge University Press
Stanley Wolpert (2009). A New History of India. Oxford University Press.
 Peter Hardy (7 December 1972). The Muslims of British India CUP Archive. .

Further reading
 India's Constitutional Question – The Cabinet Mission Plan 1946
 

Indian independence movement
Pakistan Movement
Partition of India
Cabinet
1946 in British India